Lightning Point is an Australian television teen drama set in the modern day with fantasy elements. It was filmed on location at the Gold Coast and Byron Bay in 2011. The half-hour series is produced by Jonathan M. Shiff for Network Ten in association with Nickelodeon and German public broadcaster ZDF. It was re-broadcast on Network Ten in Australia on 22 June 2012, and again on the same network from 5 July 2014.

The series premiered on TeenNick in the United States under its international title of Alien Surf Girls on 29 May 2012, and aired on Nickelodeon in the United Kingdom from 23 July 2012 also as Alien Surf Girls.

It was announced by co-star Jessica Green that the series would not return for a second season.

Premise
When Zoey and Kiki, two irrepressible girls from another galaxy and world called Lumina become castaways in the quiet, Australian seaside town of Lightning Point after losing their spaceship, they recruit local girl Amber to keep them undercover. But the whole town is abuzz with the sightings of U.F.O.s; the girls soon realize that they may not be the first intergalactic visitors on planet Earth. When the time comes, can they say farewell to a world as wonderful and beautiful as Lumina?

Characters

Main
 Amber Mitchell (Philippa Coulthard) – Amber grew up in Lightning Point and her life was pretty normal until two alien girls from another planet, Lumina, turned to her for help. Zoey and Kiki are unusual, unpredictable, and completely unaware how to fit in on Earth. Despite Amber's efforts to help them keep a low profile, Zoey and Kiki seem to attract attention everywhere they go. Amber lives with her mum, who works as a police sergeant, and their dog, Piper. She's best friends with Luca, but she doesn't share his obsession with aliens. When she's not teaching Zoey and Kiki how to act more human, Amber teaches little kids how to surf.
 Zoey (Lucy Fry) – Zoey is smarter, wilder, and more impulsive than most Earth people, so she doesn't exactly blend into the crowd. She wants to be in control of every situation, but that's tricky on an unfamiliar planet. Zoey is naturally competitive, and she can't resist a challenge, so this daredevil surfer pushes herself to the limit on the waves. She instantly catches the attention of Brandon, the local surf star, and makes her first Earth enemy—his girlfriend, Madison.
 Kiki (Jessica Green) – Kiki is new in town and new on the planet. Sensitive and curious, she's fascinated by Lightning Point, and wants to experience everything it has to offer. She loves connecting with nature (especially on a surfboard), and getting to know the local creatures, human and otherwise. She wants to understand what it really means to be human. Kiki often feels homesick for Lumina, but when she starts to fall for Amber's best friend, Luca, she realizes that staying on Earth a little longer might not be so bad.
 Luca Benedict (Kenji Fitzgerald) – Luca is a bit of an outsider in Lightning Point. He doesn't surf and he has a keen interest in extraterrestrial alien life, which makes him an easy target for Brandon and his friends. Amber is the only person who really understands Luca because they have been best friends and neighbours since they were little. When Zoey and Kiki arrive, Luca witnesses signs of alien activity, and becomes determined to investigate. But as Luca and Kiki grow even more romantically closer, Luca's conviction about the presence of aliens becomes stronger.
 Madison (Paige Houden) – Madison considers herself the hottest girl in Lightning Point, so she's not thrilled when two beautiful surfers named Kiki and Zoey show up on her turf. Madison is used to getting what she wants, and she's not about to let anything threaten her place in the social hierarchy. When Madison senses romantic sparks between her boyfriend, Brandon, and Zoey, she'll do anything to make Zoey look bad.
 Brandon Benedict (Andrew James Morley) – Outgoing and popular, Brandon is sort of a local celebrity. He's the best surfer in town—although Zoey's arrival in Lightning Point could change that. Brandon is fascinated by the mysterious new girl and her impressive surfing skills, and his girlfriend Madison takes an instant dislike to Zoey. He was adopted by the Benedicts after his parents died in a boat accident when he was a child. Brandon teases his brother Luca for believing in UFOs and space aliens.

Recurring
 Olivia Mitchell (Simone Bennett-Smith) – Olivia is the local Police Sergeant and Amber's mother.
 Liam (Reece Milne) – Liam is Brandon's friend, and enemies with Amber, Kiki and Zoey.
 Gina (Da Yen Zheng) – Gina is Madison's best friend.
 Mia (Lia Fisher) – Mia is the owner of the local diner and is from the United States.
 Josh (Erin Mullally) – Josh is a boy who Amber has a crush on. He has a little brother named Sean.
 Mr. Phillips (Anthony Standish) – Mr. Phillips is a high school teacher.
 Piper the Dog (Java) – Piper is the local police dog and Amber's pet.
 Bandit the Horse (Elmo) – Bandit is Luca's horse. Kiki finds a liking for him.

Episodes

International release dates

References

External links
 
 

2010s teen drama television series
2012 Australian television series debuts
2012 Australian television series endings
Australian children's fantasy television series
Australian children's television series
Australian science fiction television series
Australian drama television series
Network 10 original programming
English-language television shows
Television series about teenagers
Television shows set in Gold Coast, Queensland